Robert James Mullenger (22 July 1916 – 11 October 1983) was an Australian rules footballer who played with South Melbourne in the Victorian Football League (VFL).

Mullenger's career was interrupted by his service in the Australian Army during World War II, serving in Malaya and Singapore and spending three years in POW camps in Singapore, Burma and Thailand.

Mullenger's younger brother, Allan Mullenger, also played for South Melbourne.

Notes

External links 

1916 births
1983 deaths
Australian rules footballers from Melbourne
Sydney Swans players
People from Fairfield, Victoria
Australian Army personnel of World War II
Military personnel from Melbourne